Le Lac (English : The Lake) is one of the most famous poems of Lamartine, in the Méditations poétiques published in 1820.

Lamartine greatly admired Julie Charles, the wife of the famous physicist Jacques Charles. The poet's muse had been unable to come to the Lac du Bourget, the locale of many previous encounters in August 1817. There they had planned to meet again; mortally ill with tuberculosis, she died after. Lamartine returned to the lake alone to see again the places they had visited together. Surprised to find the natural setting unchanged and indifferent, he wished it could preserve some memory of their past happiness. The poet sighs at the memory of a star-lit night on the lake with his muse and laments the onrush of time that relentlessly carries one away from such happy moments. Consisting of sixteen quatrains, it was met with great acclaim and propelled its author to the forefront of the list of famous romantic poets.

The poem is often compared to the Tristesse d'Olympio of Victor Hugo and the Souvenir of Alfred de Musset. It was set to music by Niedermeyer and more recently by British composer David Matthews, which was premiered by the Orchestra of the Swan and soprano April Fredrick under the baton of Kenneth Woods in 2019.

Le lac

Related article 
 Antoine Léonard Thomas, author of the hemistich "Pause in your trek O Time!", copied from the poem "Ode sur le temps" by Lamartine in Le Lac.

References

External links 
 Listen to this Lamartine's poem set to music by Niedermeyer

Aix-les-Bains
French poems